Leonard Harris or Len Harris may refer to:

 Len Harris (cinematographer) (1916–1995), British cinematographer
 Len Harris (politician) (born 1943), Australian politician 
 Len Harris (cricketer) (1934–2006), West Indies cricketer
 Leonard Montague Harris (1855–1947), New Zealand cricketer
 Leonard Harris (actor) (1929–2011), American actor and entertainment critic
 Leonard Harris (philosopher), contemporary American philosophy professor
 Leonard Harris (American football) (born 1960), American football player